Odontitella is a monotypic genus of flowering plants belonging to the family Orobanchaceae. The only species is Odontitella virgata.

Its native range is Iberian Peninsula.

References

Orobanchaceae
Orobanchaceae genera
Monotypic Lamiales genera